The Central Mexican broad-clawed shrew (Cryptotis alticola ) is a species of mammal in the family Soricidae. It is found in the highlands above 2000 m in the Mexican states of Colima, Hidalgo, Jalisco, Michoacán, Mexico, and Puebla, Morelos, and in the Mexican Federal District

Type locality: Mexico, Volcán Popocatépetl, 11,500 ft. (3505 m).

References

 Don E. Wilson & DeeAnn M. Reeder (editors). 2005. Cryptotis alticola. Mammal Species of the World. A Taxonomic and Geographic Reference (3rd ed), Johns Hopkins University Press, 2,142 pp. (Available from Johns Hopkins University Press, 1-800-537-5487 or (410) 516-6900, or at Press JHU).

Cryptotis
Endemic mammals of Mexico